Giorgio Bortolozzi (born 4 January 1937) is a former Italian long jumper and master athlete.

Career
Two-time national champion at senior level in long jump in 1962 and 1964.

Doping as a master athlete
In 2016 he was found positive for a steroid at the Italian Masters Championships, disqualified for 4 years, in 2020, at the age of 83 he returned to compete and win in masters athletics.

Achievements

Masters athletics

See also
 List of Italian records in masters athletics

References

External links
 Poker di titoli "Master" per Bortolozzi, super atleta di 85 anni qualificato per i Mondiali in Finlandia (in Italian)

1937 births
Living people
Italian male long jumpers
Italian masters athletes
Doping cases in athletics